A Good Thing is an album by jazz alto saxophonist Allen Mezquida.

Music and recording
One of the tracks is a Mezquida original. The album was released on CD by Koch in 1996.

Reception
The AllMusic reviewer stated that Mezquida "has a thoughtful and lightly swinging style while displaying a great deal of inner tension."

Disillusioned with jazz, Mezquida subsequently turned to drawing cartoons.

Track listing
"Rip Van Winkle"
"Revelation"
"The Way You Look Tonight"
"Tears"
"Father Flanagan"
"Waltzin' Gold"
"A Good Thing"
"Ballad for the Carpenter"

Personnel
 Allen Mezquida – alto sax
 Bill Mays – piano
 Brad Mehldau – piano
 Sean Smith – bass
 Leon Parker – drums

References

1996 albums